Lili Mizuno (born February 4, 2001) is an American rhythmic gymnast. She is the 2018 Pan American Championships hoop silver medalist.

Gymnastics career

Junior 
Mizuno joined the junior national team in 2015.

In February 2016 she made her international debut at the Alina Cup in Moscow, finishing fourth in clubs with a score of 15.400. At the Pacific Rim Championships in April, Mizuno won the junior all-around. She took gold in all four apparatus finals as well. In June at the US Gymnastics Championships, Mizuno won gold in hoops and clubs, silver in all-around and rope, and placed fourth in ball.

Senior

2017 
Mizuno joined the senior national team in 2017. In March, she competed at the Rhythmic Challenge in Indianapolis, Indiana, winning gold in ball and bronze in all-around. At the end of March, she was assigned to three international competitions: Marbella Grand Prix in Marbella, Spain from March 31-April 2; Sofia International Tournament in Sofia, Bulgaria in May; and Guadalajara World Challenge Cup in Guadalajara, Spain from June 2–4. At the US Gymnastics Championships in June, she won clubs silver behind Olympian Laura Zeng. Mizuno competed at the Pan American Championships in October, capturing silver in hoop, ball, ribbon and all-around, behind teammate Evita Griskenas.

2018 
At the 2018 Rhythmic Challenge in February, Mizuno was third all-around with a score of 63.800. At the end of March, Mizuno was assigned to four international competitions: Sofia International Tournament from March 30-April 1; Baku World Cup in Baku, Azerbaijan from April 27–29; Guadalajara World Challenge Cup from May 4–6; and Portimao World Challenge Cup in Portimao, Portugal from May 11–13. In July at the US Gymnastics Championships, Mizuno was fourth in clubs and fifth all-around. At the Pan American Championships in September, she won silver in hoop, behind teammate Laura Zeng and ahead of Mexico's Marina Malpica.

2019 
Mizuno captured gold in all-around and ball, plus silver in hoop, clubs and ribbon at the Rhythmic Challenge in February. In March she competed at MTM Ljubljana International Tournament in Ljubljana, Slovenia, finishing fifth all-around. At the Pesaro World Cup in Pesaro, Italy, from April 5–7, Mizuno finished 35th all-around, far behind fellow American Evita Griskenas, who finished sixth. At the Tashkent World Cup in Tashkent, Uzbekistan on April 19–21, she finished 17th all-around and did not advance to any apparatus finals. At the US Gymnastics Championships in July, she won ball bronze with a score of 18.800, behind Laura Zeng and Evita Griskenas. Mizuno competed at the Kazan World Challenge Cup in Kazan, Russia from August 30-September 1, placing 28th all-around. At Japan's AEON Cup in October, the American team finished eighth and Mizuno finished fifteenth all-around.

2020 
Mizuno started her 2020 season in February at the Rhythmic Challenge in Lake Placid, New York. Mizuno placed fourth all-around, behind Lennox Hopkins-Williams and ahead of Elena Shinohara. She was third with ball, fourth in hoop and ribbon, and seventh in clubs.

2021 
Mizuno was selected to represent the United States at the 2020 Summer Olympics alongside Camilla Feeley, Isabelle Connor, Nicole Sladkov, and Elizaveta Pletneva. They finished eleventh in the qualification round for the group all-around.

Personal life 
Mizuno was born in Kawasaki, Japan. Before serious gymnast careers she joined Rhythmic Gymnastics Academy East Bay where she first started.

References 

2001 births
Living people
American rhythmic gymnasts
Gymnasts at the 2020 Summer Olympics
Japanese emigrants to the United States
Olympic gymnasts of the United States
American women of Japanese descent in politics
21st-century American women
Competitors at the 2022 World Games